Nicolo Deligia (born 17 April 1940) is an Italian modern pentathlete. He competed at the 1968 and 1972 Summer Olympics.

References

1940 births
Living people
Italian male modern pentathletes
Olympic modern pentathletes of Italy
Modern pentathletes at the 1968 Summer Olympics
Modern pentathletes at the 1972 Summer Olympics
People from the Province of Oristano
Sportspeople from Sardinia
20th-century Italian people